Carex phalaroides is a tussock-forming species of perennial sedge in the family Cyperaceae. It is native to parts of South America.

See also
List of Carex species

References

phalaroides
Plants described in 1837
Taxa named by Carl Sigismund Kunth
Flora of Argentina
Flora of Bolivia
Flora of Brazil
Flora of Chile
Flora of Ecuador
Flora of Guatemala
Flora of Paraguay
Flora of Uruguay
Flora of Venezuela